Damir Rastić (born July 23, 1988) is Serbian biathlete.

He represents Serbia at the Biathlon World Championships, Biathlon World Cup and IBU Cup.

Biathlon results
All results are sourced from the International Biathlon Union.

World Championships
0 medals

*During Olympic seasons competitions are only held for those events not included in the Olympic program.
**The single mixed relay was added as an event in 2019.

References

Serbian male biathletes
Living people
1988 births
People from Sjenica
Cross-country skiers at the 2018 Winter Olympics
Olympic cross-country skiers of Serbia
Serbian male cross-country skiers